6.Pan Arab Games - Rabat, Morocco - August 1985
Finals:

References 

Boxing at the Pan Arab Games
1985 Pan Arab Games
1985 in boxing